Pontsionnorton (Pont Sion Norton), Welsh for (John) Norton's Bridge, is so named because of a small bridge over the Glamorganshire Canal at this point.  The village/district falls within the electoral ward of Cilfynydd of the larger town and community of Pontypridd, Rhondda Cynon Taf, South Wales, and overlooks the A470 as it travells towards Abercynon.  The village falls within the historic parish of Eglwysilan is bounded by Cilfynydd, Coedpenmaen, Trallwn and Glyncoch, and was once location of Bodwenarth Colliery, located in Bodwenarth Woods close to the main school - Ysgol Gynradd Gymraeg Pont Sion Norton.

References

External links
https://web.archive.org/web/20110407161519/http://www.genuki.org.uk/big/wal/GLA/Eglwysilan/PontSionNorton/
http://www.geograph.org.uk/gridref/ST0891?inner
https://web.archive.org/web/20111003130459/http://archive.rhondda-cynon-taf.gov.uk/treorchy/index.php?a=wordsearch&s=gallery&w=pont+sion+norton

Villages in Rhondda Cynon Taf